Joanna Karen "Jo" Watts (born 18 May 1987) is an English former cricketer who played as a right-arm off break bowler and right-handed batter. She appeared in seven One Day Internationals for England in 2005, taking six wickets at an average of 35.00 and an economy rate of 4.24. She played county cricket for Kent between 2004 and 2013.

References

External links
 
 

1987 births
Living people
Sportspeople from Maidstone
England women One Day International cricketers
Kent women cricketers